The Journal of the History of Philosophy is a quarterly peer-reviewed academic journal. It was established in 1963 after the Eastern Division of the American Philosophical Association passed a motion to this effect in 1957. The journal is published by the Johns Hopkins University Press and covers the history of Western philosophy. Time periods covered include everything from the ancient period to modern developments in the study of philosophy. The editor-in-chief is Deborah Boyle (College of Charleston).

References

External links 
 

Western philosophy
History of philosophy journals
Johns Hopkins University Press academic journals
Quarterly journals
Multilingual journals
Publications established in 1963